John Swannell (born 26 January 1939) is an English former amateur footballer, who played as a goalkeeper.

Club career
Swannell played non-league football for Corinthian-Casuals and Hendon; he also made one appearance in the Football League for Stockport County during the 1959–60 season.

He played in successive Amateur Cup Finals, 1965 and 1966, with Hendon at Wembley Stadium, being a winner on the first occasion versus Whitby Town, and a loser on the second. Swannell was also in goal when Hendon won the FA Amateur Cup again in 1972 beating Enfield.

International career
Swannell is England's second most capped amateur international. He was also a member of the British national side which failed to qualify for both the 1968 Summer Olympics and 1972 Summer Olympics.

References

1939 births
Living people
English footballers
Corinthian-Casuals F.C. players
Stockport County F.C. players
Hendon F.C. players
English Football League players
Association football goalkeepers
People from Walton-on-Thames